Joseph is a city in Wallowa County, Oregon, United States. Originally named Silver Lake and Lake City, the city formally named itself in 1880 for  Chief Joseph (1840–1904) of the Nez Perce people. The population was 1,081 at the 2010 census.

History 
Joseph was platted in 1883, and the economy was originally based around agriculture, especially grain and stock. In 1896 the First Bank of Joseph was robbed, one robber was shot and killed, another shot and captured, and a third escaped with the money. On occasion there have been reenactments of the robbery.  After a railroad line was completed to Joseph in 1908, a lumber mill opened, bolstering the economy.

When the timber industry collapsed in the 1980s, local unemployment rate approached 17%. However, in 1982 a new industry was born as three bronze foundries opened in the local area.

The city sponsors the annual Chief Joseph Days Rodeo in late July, Bronze, Blues and Brews in August since 2001, and Alpenfest in September, a Swiss-Bavarian festival staged in Joseph and at nearby Wallowa Lake. Alpenfest resembles an Oktoberfest but has more yodeling and alphorn playing, reflecting the area's reputation as "Oregon's Little Switzerland."

Geography

Climate
This climatic region is typified by large seasonal temperature differences, with warm to hot (and often humid) summers and cold (sometimes severely cold) winters. According to the Köppen Climate Classification system, Joseph has a humid continental climate, abbreviated "Dfb" on climate maps.

Demographics

2010 census
As of the census of 2010, there were 1,081 people, 509 households, and 305 families living in the city. The racial makeup of the city was 94.7% White, 0.7% African American, 0.9% Native American, 0.4% Asian, 0.5% Pacific Islander, 0.7% from other races, and 2.0% from two or more races. Hispanic or Latino of any race were 2.0% of the population.

There were 509 households, of which 22.0% had children under the age of 18 living with them, 46.6% were married couples living together, 9.4% had a female householder with no husband present, 3.9% had a male householder with no wife present, and 40.1% were non-families. 34.6% of all households were made up of individuals, and 13.3% had someone living alone who was 65 years of age or older. The average household size was 2.06 and the average family size was 2.57.

The median age in the city was 51 years. 17% of residents were under the age of 18; 6.6% were between the ages of 18 and 24; 18.2% were from 25 to 44; 36.1% were from 45 to 64; and 22.2% were 65 years of age or older. The gender makeup of the city was 47.9% male and 52.1% female.

2000 census
As of the census of 2000, there were 1,054 people, 450 households, and 288 families living in the city. The population density was 1,234.8 people per square mile (478.8/km). There were 543 housing units at an average density of 636.2 per square mile (246.7/km). The racial makeup of the city was 94.88% White, 0.47% Native American, 0.19% Asian, 0.09% Pacific Islander, 1.42% from other races, and 2.94% from two or more races. Hispanic or Latino of any race were 1.23% of the population.

There were 450 households, out of which 28.9% had children under the age of 18 living with them, 49.6% were married couples living together, 10.2% had a female householder with no husband present, and 35.8% were non-families. 31.6% of all households were made up of individuals, and 14.0% had someone living alone who was 65 years of age or older. The average household size was 2.26 and the average family size was 2.84.

In the city, the population dispersal was 24.2% under the age of 18, 5.4% from 18 to 24, 22.4% from 25 to 44, 27.0% from 45 to 64, and 21.0% who were 65 years of age or older. The median age was 43 years. For every 100 females, there were 98.5 males. For every 100 females age 18 and over, there were 91.1 males.

The median income for a household in the city was $31,310, and the median income for a family was $36,250. Males had a median income of $25,938 versus $21,563 for females. The per capita income for the city was $16,163. About 7.9% of families and 12.2% of the population were below the poverty line, including 9.8% of those under age 18 and 13.0% of those age 65 or over.

Transportation

 Joseph State Airport
 Wallowa Lake Tramway

Notable people
 Joseph, a band started by Natalie, Allison, and Meegan Closner, named after the town.
 Chief Joseph
 Rod Scribner
 Walter Brennan
 Margaret Osborne duPont

References

External links

 
 Entry for Joseph in the Oregon Blue Book
  City of Joseph
 Joseph Chamber of Commerce
 Wallowa County Chamber of Commerce
 Chief Joseph Days – official site
 Bronze Blues & Brews – official site
 Oregon Alpenfest – official site

 
Cities in Oregon
Cities in Wallowa County, Oregon
1883 establishments in Oregon
Populated places established in 1883